Ornipholidotos bakotae, the tiny glasswing, is a butterfly in the family Lycaenidae. It is found in Cameroon, the Republic of the Congo and Gabon. The habitat consists of forests.

References

Butterflies described in 1962
Ornipholidotos